The 1973–74 Yorkshire Cup was the sixty-sixth occasion on which the  Yorkshire Cup Rugby competition had been held.

Leeds won the trophy by beating Wakefield Trinity by the score of 7-2. The match was played at Headingley, Leeds, now in West Yorkshire. The attendance was 7,621 and receipts were £3,728.

This was Leeds' fourth victory (and the  second of two consecutive victories) in what would be eight times in the space of thirteen seasons. It was also the first of two consecutive Yorkshire Cup final appearances by Wakefield Trinity, both of which would result in defeat

Background 
The Rugby League Yorkshire Cup competition was a knock-out competition between (mainly professional) rugby league clubs from  the  county of Yorkshire. The actual area was at times increased to encompass other teams from  outside the  county such as Newcastle, Mansfield, Coventry, and even London (in the form of Acton & Willesden).

The Rugby League season always (until the onset of "Summer Rugby" in 1996) ran from around August-time through to around May-time and this competition always took place early in the season, in the Autumn, with the final taking place in (or just before) December (The only exception to this was when disruption of the fixture list was caused during, and immediately after, the two World Wars)

This season there were no junior/amateur clubs taking part, no new entrants and no "leavers" and so the total of entries remained the  same at sixteen.
This in turn resulted in no byes in the first round.

Competition and results

Round 1 
Involved  8 matches (with no byes) and 16 clubs

Round 2 - Quarter-finals 
Involved 4 matches and 8 clubs

Round 3 – Semi-finals  
Involved 2 matches and 4 clubs

Final

Teams and scorers 

Scoring - Try = three points - Goal = two points - Drop goal = one point

The road to success

See also 
1973–74 Northern Rugby Football League season
Rugby league county cups

Notes and comments

References

External links
Saints Heritage Society
1896–97 Northern Rugby Football Union season at wigan.rlfans.com 
Hull&Proud Fixtures & Results 1896/1897
Widnes Vikings - One team, one passion Season In Review - 1896-97
The Northern Union at warringtonwolves.org

1973 in English rugby league
RFL Yorkshire Cup